Rubinek is a surname. Notable people with the surname include: 

Gyula Rubinek (1865–1922), Hungarian politician
Saul Rubinek (born 1948), Canadian actor

Jewish surnames